The Hornby Vellard was a project to build a causeway uniting all seven islands of Bombay into a single island with a deep natural harbour. The project was started by the governor William Hornby in 1782 and all islands were linked by 1838. The word vellard appears to be a local corruption of the Portuguese word vallado meaning fence or embankment.

The purpose of this causeway was to block the Worli creek and prevent the low-lying areas of Bombay from being flooded at high tide. The cost was estimated at ₹£100,000. It was completed in 1784 and was one of the first major civil engineering projects that transformed the original seven islands of Bombay into one island.

According to some accounts, Hornby ordered the work to be started after the East India Company turned down his proposal; and continued as Governor till the end of his term in 1785, ignoring the suspension notice sent to him.

Citations and references 
Citations

References
 
 

History of Mumbai